Asaf Sirkis (born 1969) is an Israeli jazz drummer, composer and educator.

Early life
Sirkis spent his teens and early twenties in Rehovot, Israel where he began drum lessons aged 12. His early musical influences were The Beatles, The Police, Yes, Allan Holdsworth, Weather Report, classical music, Arabic, Balkan, Klezmer, Pop, and Israeli folk music. In 1990, shortly after he completed his three-year national service he started his full-time professional career working as an all-around drummer in Israel. He has played with notable jazz musicians from Israel and abroad including Harold Rubin, Albert Beger, Yair Dalal and Eyal Sela.

Career 
In 1993 Sirkis moved to Tel Aviv and soon after formed the Asaf Sirkis trio featuring Kobi Arad on keyboards, and Gabriel Mayer on electric bass. With that line up he recorded his first solo album One Step Closer (1996) as well as touring in Israel with the trio. In 1997 he formed the 'Asaf Sirkis & The Inner Noise' trio. The Inner Noise was a unique trio and the first jazz/rock group to incorporate an innovative line up of church organ guitar and drums.

Asaf left Israel in 1998, settling in London in 1999. In 2000 Sirkis re-formed the Inner Noise trio with Steve Lodder on church organ and Mike Outram on guitar. The band has recorded three acclaimed albums - Inner Noise, We Are Falling and The Song Within. Shortly after he arrived in London he met Gilad Atzmon with whom he formed The Orient House Ensemble and recorded 7 albums, including Exile, which won "Best CD of the Year" at the BBC Jazz Award 2003 while the band was nominated for "Best Band" in 2004. After almost 10 years in the OHE, Sirkis left the band in 2009 to focus on his solo career and other collaborations.

Since 2006 Sirkis has been collaborating with reeds player and composer Tim Garland with whom he toured the world and recorded many albums. Asaf has also worked with Jacob Collier, Larry Coryell, Gwilym Simcock, John Abercrombie, Kenny Wheeler, Norma Winstone, John Taylor, Gary Husband, Andy Sheppard, Dave Liebman, Natacha Atlas, Bob Sheppard, Mark Egan, Soft Machine, John Etheridge, Mark Wingfield, Nicolas Meier, David Binney, Norman Watt-Roy, Wilko Johnson, Jeff Berlin, Billy Sherwood and many more.

Since 2014, Sirkis is co-leading the Sirkis/Bialas International Quartet together with Polish singer/composer Sylwia Bialas. The Quartet features pianist Frank Harrison and Scottish bassist Kevin Glasgow. Their debut album Come To Me was released in 2014 at the London Jazz Festival. Come To Me has been selected as one of the best albums of 2015 at All About Jazz website by several reviewers and the band has toured extensively since the release date. The Quartet's new double album 'Our New Earth' is scheduled to be released in 2019 on Moonjune Records. 

Recently, Asaf has been collaborating with various artists on the Moonjune Records record label. Notably, the Reuter/Wingfield/Stavi Sirkis collaboration album has been selected as a masterpiece of 2017 at DownBeat magazine as well as receiving rave reviews. Asaf can be heard on many recent Moonjune albums alongside Spanish guitarist Carles Benavent, Nguyen Le, Dewa Budjana, Indonesian pianist Dwiki Dharmawan, Gary Husband, Mark Wingfield, Markus Reuter, and many more.

Education 
Sirkis has been studying the art of the south Indian vocal percussion (Konnakol) at the Tamil centre in west London under the guidance of master percussionist Mr Paramasamy Kirupakaran and from various other sources. Asaf has developed a simple, step-by-step method of teaching Konnakol that can help any instrumentalist or vocalist of any musical genre and level to increase rhythmic awareness and focus. Nowadays, Sirkis is involved in a variety of educational work, bringing Konnakol to western music education as a useful tool of understanding rhythm for western musicians. He has given many workshops and seminars around the world on the subject and has a YouTube channel with Konnakol tutorials. As of 2017, he is a principal lecturer in jazz drums at Leeds College of Music and teaches drums and Konnakol at Trinity Laban Conservatory in London.

Discography

As leader and collaborator 

(2022) Asaf Sirkis, *Solar flash
(2019) The Sirkis/Bialas International Quartet, Our New Earth
(2016) Asaf Sirkis, "Full Moon"
(2014) The Sirkis/Bialas International Quartet, Come to Me
(2013) Asaf Sirkis Trio, Shepherd's Stories 
(2012) Simcock/Garland/Sirkis, Lighthouse ACT
(2010) Asaf Sirkis Trio, Letting Go
(2008) Asar Sirkis Trio, The Monk
(2007) Asaf Sirkis & The Inner Noise, The Song Within
(2005) Asaf Sirkis & The Inner Noise, We are Falling
(2003) Asaf Sirkis & The Inner Noise, Inner Noise 
(1998) Asaf Sirkis Trio, One Step Closer

As a sideman
(1990) Biological Madness – Biological Madness
(1991) Odeon – Odeon
(1992) Tact – Downtown
(1993) Harold Rubin – Trialog
(1993) Changes – Changes
(1994) Rami Shuler – With One Breath
(1994) Return to Zero – Return to Zero
(1994) Fantasy Jazz Trio – F.J.T.
(1995) Albert Beger – The Primitive
(1995) Return to Zero – Back for More
(1996) Harold Rubin – Blue Bag
(1997) Albert Beger – This Life
(1997) Amir Perelman Trio – Trio 97 Vol. 1
(1998) Eyal Maoz & Asaf Sirkis – Freedom Has Its Own Taste
(1999) Christoph Spendel – The Three Worlds
(1999) Adel Salameh – Nuzha
(2000) Gilad Atzmon & the Orient House Ensemble – Orient House
(2001) Eyal Sela – Sela
(2001) Gilad Atzmon & the Orient House Ensemble – Nostalgico
(2001) Various Artists – The More We Know: 30 Years of Enja Records
(2001) Nick Homes – Not Tonight
(2002) The Meier Group – Ribbon in the Wind
(2002) Simon Fisher Turner – Swift
(2002) Phil Robson – Impish
(2002) Mark Latimer – Unhinged, Take 2
(2002) Lee Gibson – Songs of Time And Place
(2003) Gilad Atzmon and the Orient House Ensemble – Exile
(2003) John Williams – Tenorama
(2003) Nick Homes – Indian Summer
(2004) Gilad Atzmon & the Orient House Ensemble – MusiK
(2005) Tim Garland's Lighthouse – If The Sea Replied
(2005) Nicolas Meier Group – Orient
(2005) Simon Fisher Turner – LANA LARA LATA
(2005) Tassos Spiliotopoulos Quartet – Wait for Dusk
(2005) John Donaldson Trio – Music Box
(2006) Alcyona Mick – Around the Sun
(2006) Gilad Atzmon Presents Artie Fishel & The Promised Band – Artie Fishel
(2006) Klaus Gesing – Heart Luggage
(2007) Nicolas Meier – YUZ
(2007) Glauco Venier & Yuri Goloubev – Homage a Duke
(2007) Sirkis/Venier/Goloubev – Intermezzo
(2007) Tim Garland – The Mystery (featuring Chick Corea)
(2007) Law/Burgess/Sirkis – The Art of Sound Volume 1
(2007) Gilad Atzmon & The Orient House Ensemble – Refuge
(2007) Dan Stern – Traces
(2007) Tim Garland – The Northern Underground Orchestra
(2008) SGS Group (Sirkis/Goloubev/Simcock) – Presents...
(2008) Nicolas Meier – Silence Talks
(2008) Massimo Colombo Trio – Il Goico Delle Forme
(2009) Sarah Gillespie – Stalking Juliet
(2009) Tim Garland Lighthouse Trio – Libra
(2009) Yuri Goloubev – Metafore Semplici
(2009) Gilad Atzmon – In Loving Memory of America
(2009) Polly Scattergood – Polly Scattergood
(2009) John Law's Art of Sound Trio – Volume 4, Congregation
(2009) Nicolas Meier – Journey
(2009) Simon Fisher Turner – Music From Films You Should Have Seen
(2009) Nicolas Meier Trios – Breeze
(2009) Asaf Sirkis & Eyal Maoz Duo – Elementary Dialogues
(2010) Asaf Sirkis/Sassi Mizrachi/Kobi Arad – Vagabond
(2010) Jonathan Cohen's Time Loves Changes Octet – Life Cycles
(2010) Tassos Spiliotopoulos – Archipelagos
(2011) Alex Hutton Trio – Legentis
(2011) Yuri Goloubev Trio – Titanic for a Bike
(2011) Carlo Magni Quartet – Notturni
(2012) John Law Congregation Featuring Asaf Sirkis & Yuri Goloubev – Three Leaps of the Gazelle
(2013) Nicolas Meier Group – From Istanbul to Ceuta With a Smile
(2013) Maciek Pysz Trio – Insight
(2013) Norman Watt-Roy – Faith & Grace
(2014) Tim Garland's Lighthouse – Songs For The North Sky
(2014) Fabienne Ambuhl Trio – Glitterwood
(2015) Mark Wingfield – Proof of Light
(2015) Alex Hutton Trio – Magna Carta Suit
(2015) Noel Langley – Edentide
(2015) Maciek Pysz – A Journey
(2016) Marco Cortesi – Spring Thing
(2016) Celine Bonacina – Crystal Rain
(2016) Tim Garland – One
(2017) Dwiki Dharmawan – Pasar Klewer
(2017) Wingfield/Reuter/Stavi/Sirkis – The Stone House
(2017) Dusan Jevtovic – No Answer
(2017) Wingfield/Reuter/Sirkis – Lighthouse
(2018) Mark Wingfield – Tales from the Dreaming City
(2018) The Lie Detectors – Secret Unit
(2018) Dwiki Dharmawan – Rumah Batu
(2018) Ant Law – Life I Know (guest appearance)
(2019) Markus Reuter – Truce

References

External links
Asaf's website
YouTube channel

Selected interviews 
Anil Prasad interviews Asaf Sirkis
Mike Dolbear interviews Asaf Sirkis
Asaf's interview at Jazz Australia
BBC interview with Claire Martin
London Jazz News about (a tribute to Larry Coryell)
Interview with Richard Sharma
Sussex Jazz Magazine

Selected reviews 
Budd Kopman's 5 star review at All About Jazz website - The Sirkis Bialas International Quartet, Come To Me
John Kelman's review of Shepherd's Stories
Jazz Breakfast review - Shepherd's Stories
London Jazz News - Shepherd's Stories
Mike Dolbar's review of Shepherd's Stories

1969 births
Living people
Israeli jazz musicians
Jazz drummers
People from Rehovot
People from Tel Aviv